Klewaria is a genus of darkling beetles in the family Tenebrionidae, found in the Palearctic.

References

Tenebrionoidea